Mrs. Black Is Back is a 1914 American silent comedy film directed by Thomas N. Heffron and written by George V. Hobart and Eve Unsell. The film stars May Irwin, Charles Lane, Clara Blandick, Wellington A. Playter, Elmer Booth and James Hester. The film was released on November 30, 1914, by Paramount Pictures.

Cast 
May Irwin as Mrs. Black
Charles Lane as Professor Newton Black
Clara Blandick as Emily Mason
Wellington A. Playter as Tom Larkey
Elmer Booth as Jack Dangerfield
James Hester as Major Thorne
Cyril Chadwick as Bramley Bush
Marie Pavis as Priscilla Black
Howard Missimer as Valet

References

External links 

1914 films
1914 comedy-drama films
Paramount Pictures films
American black-and-white films
Films directed by Thomas N. Heffron
American silent feature films
1910s English-language films
1910s American films
Silent American comedy-drama films